Glenoleon  is a genus of antlions in the insect family Myrmeleontidae in the order Neuroptera. There are 32 species.

Species

References

External links

Myrmeleontidae
Myrmeleontidae genera
Taxa named by Nathan Banks